The 2022 Little Rock Challenger was a professional tennis tournament played on hard courts. It was the third edition of the tournament which was part of the 2022 ATP Challenger Tour. It took place in Little Rock, Arkansas, United States from May 30 to June 5 2022.

Singles main-draw entrants

Seeds

 1 Rankings are as of May 23 2022.

Other entrants
The following players received wildcards into the singles main draw:
  Brandon Holt
  Ben Shelton
  Donald Young

The following player received entry into the singles main draw using a protected ranking:
  Andrew Harris

The following players received entry from the qualifying draw:
  Román Andrés Burruchaga
  Murphy Cassone
  Strong Kirchheimer
  Gilbert Klier Júnior
  Adrián Menéndez Maceiras
  Zachary Svajda

Champions

Singles

  Jason Kubler def.  Wu Tung-lin 6–0, 6–2.

Doubles

  Andrew Harris /  Christian Harrison def.  Robert Galloway /  Max Schnur 6–3, 6–4.

References

2022 ATP Challenger Tour
2022 in American tennis
May 2022 sports events in the United States
June 2022 sports events in the United States
2022 in sports in Arkansas
Little Rock Challenger